The Chemex Coffeemaker is a manual pour-over style glass coffeemaker, invented by Peter Schlumbohm in 1941, manufactured by the Chemex Corporation in Chicopee, Massachusetts.

In 1958, designers at the Illinois Institute of Technology said that the Chemex Coffeemaker is "one of the best-designed products of modern times" and it is included in the collection of the Museum of Modern Art in New York City.

Design

The Chemex coffeemaker consists of an hourglass-shaped glass flask with a conical funnel-like neck and proprietary filters, made of bonded paper, that are thicker than the standard paper filters used for a drip coffeemaker. The thicker paper of the Chemex filters removes most of the coffee oils and makes coffee that is much "cleaner" than coffee brewed in other coffee-making systems. The "cleaner" cup extracts caffeine and flavor while removing bitter notes. The thicker filters may also assist in removing more cafestol, a cholesterol-elevating compound found in coffee.

The most visually distinctive feature of the Chemex is the heatproof wooden collar around the neck, which allows it to be easily handled and poured when full of hot coffee. The collar is turned and then split in two to allow it to fit around the glass neck. The two pieces are held loosely in place by a tied leather thong. For a design piece that became popular post-war at a time of Modernism and precision manufacture, this juxtaposition of natural wood and the organic nature of a hand-tied knot with the laboratory nature of glassware  was a distinctive feature of its appearance.

Brewing coffee

Coffee is brewed by first folding the paper filter into shape by using the folded side with a printed number 3, where the pour spout is located and placing it into the neck of the flask. The Chemex filter should be rinsed with hot water to remove any paper taste. After dumping the water, ground coffee is added to the rinsed paper filter. The coarse grind will resemble kosher salt for the best flavor. Hot water (93–96 °C/195–205 °F) is then poured through the coffee and filter, depositing brewed coffee into the flask. There is a spout located on the top half of the brewer. This allows for easily pouring out coffee post brew and ensures airflow while brewing.

References

External links 

Chemex Coffeemakers & Filters – Official Website

Coffee preparation
Articles containing video clips
Products introduced in 1941
American inventions